A battle-axe is a formidable woman: aggressive, domineering and forceful.

The prime example was the militant temperance activist Carrie Nation, who actually wielded a hatchet and made it her symbol, living in Hatchet Hall and publishing a magazine called The Hatchet. She became involved in the suffragette campaign for votes for women and this campaign further established the archetype.

Other examples, listed by Christine Hamilton in her Book of British Battleaxes, include Nancy Astor, Boudica, Ena Sharples, and Ann Widdecombe.

The battleaxe is one of several stereotypes found in nursing – a tyrannical, fierce matron exemplified by Nurse Ratched or Hattie Jacques in popular medical dramas and comedies. Judith Furse played a "battle-axe woman" in the film Carry On Cabby.

See also
 Fishwife
 Jeanne Hachette
 Miss Battle-Axe
 Termagant
 Virago
 Karen (slang)

References

Further reading
 

Female stock characters
Pejorative terms for women
Stereotypes of women